Mehmet Kâmil Berk (1 May 1878 – 8 April 1958) was a Turkish physician, who was one of the personal doctors of Mustafa Kemal Atatürk. He was one of the first gastroenterologists of the Turkish Republic.

References

1878 births
1958 deaths
Physicians from Istanbul
Turkish gastroenterologists
Physicians from the Ottoman Empire